The Mark O. Hatfield Wilderness is a wilderness area located on the northern side of Mount Hood in the northwestern Cascades of the U.S. state of Oregon, near the Columbia River Gorge and within Mount Hood National Forest.  Prior to Wilderness designation it was known as the Columbia Gorge Recreation Area.

The main waterways in the Wilderness are Herman Creek, Eagle Creek, and Tanner Creek.

Geology
Groves of old growth Douglas-fir, hemlock and cedar grow in lower elevations of the Mark O. Hatfield Wilderness.  The north part of the Wilderness has features characteristic of the Columbia River Gorge, such as towering basaltic cliffs and many waterfalls.  Higher elevations are home to forested plateaus and ridges with hanging meadows, subalpine lakes, and panoramic views of the Cascade Range and the Columbia River Gorge.

Recreation
The area's close proximity to Portland makes this a somewhat popular destination. The area was named for former United States senator and Oregon governor Mark Hatfield.

See also
 List of Oregon Wildernesses
 List of U.S. Wilderness Areas
 Old growth
 List of old growth forests
 Wilderness Act

References

External links
 Mark O. Hatfield Wilderness - Wilderness.net
 Mount Hood National Forest - Wilderness
 Mount Hood National Forest Wilderness Plan
 Forests and Global Warming - Oregon Wild

Cascade Range
Old-growth forests
Wilderness areas of Oregon
Protected areas of Multnomah County, Oregon
Protected areas of Hood River County, Oregon
Mount Hood National Forest
1984 establishments in Oregon
Landforms of Multnomah County, Oregon
Protected areas established in 1984